The Kaehler–Rector House is a historic house located at 408 W. 25th St. in Merced, California. Built in the early 1890s, the house was designed by architect Louis Wegner in the Queen Anne style. The house's design includes a corner tower with a conical roof, a veranda extending to the front and east sides of the house, and a complex roof design that includes both gabled and hipped sections. A 1905 history of the San Joaquin Valley called the house "one of the finest in Merced County."

George Kaehler, the house's first owner, was a major liquor distributor in the San Joaquin Valley. In 1903, he sold the house to Judge E. N. Rector, a Merced County Superior Court judge, who lived in the house until his 1941 death.

The Kaehler–Rector House was added to the National Register of Historic Places on January 4, 1982.

References

External links

Houses on the National Register of Historic Places in California
Queen Anne architecture in California
Houses in Merced County, California
Buildings and structures in Merced, California
National Register of Historic Places in Merced County, California
Merced, California